"Curiosity (Killed the Cat)" is a song by Australian band Little River Band, released in September 1975 as the group's debut single and lead single from the group's self-titled studio album. The song peaked at number 15  on the Australian Kent Music Report singles chart.

The song was written by Beeb Birtles. In July 2003 he told Debbie Kruger of Melbourne Weekly Magazine, "I wrote "Curiosity (Killed the Cat)" in London in 1974 when I was in the band Mississippi. Graeham Goble's wife had been given a kitten, which I would see running around the house we shared, and the idea for "Curiosity (Killed the Cat)" came to me. The lyrics in the song pertain more to me being the crazy cat and my girlfriend at the time being the one to keep me on an even keel. It's a song about hope and hanging on to your dreams no matter what!"

Track listings
7" (EMI 10900)
Side A. "Curiosity (Killed the Cat)" - 3:40
Side B. "I Just Don't Get the Feeling Anymore" - 4:55

Charts

Weekly charts

Year-end charts

References 

1975 singles
Little River Band songs
1974 songs
EMI Records singles